The Fresh Prince of Bel-Air is an American television sitcom created by Andy and Susan Borowitz for NBC. It aired from September 10, 1990, to May 20, 1996. The series stars Will Smith as a fictionalized version of himself, a street-smart teenager born and raised in West Philadelphia who is sent to move in with his wealthy uncle and aunt in Bel-Air, where his lifestyle often clashes with that of his upper-class relatives.

Known as Smith's star vehicle into television, and later his film career, The Fresh Prince of Bel-Air was a top hit for NBC, running for 148 episodes over six seasons. A reunion special/retrospective reuniting the original cast debuted on HBO Max in November 2020. A more dramatic reimagining of the series, titled Bel-Air and based on the fan film of the same name, was given a two-season order for Peacock, and released on February 13, 2022.

Summary 

The theme song and opening sequence set the premise of the show. Will Smith is a street-smart African-American teenager, "born and raised" in West Philadelphia. While playing street basketball, Will accidentally hits a group of gang members with the ball, causing a confrontation that frightens his mother, who sends him to live with his wealthy aunt and uncle in the opulent neighborhood of Bel Air, Los Angeles.

Will's working class background ends up clashing in various humorous ways with the upper class world of the Banks family – Will's stern uncle Phil and tough but fair aunt Vivian and their children, Will's cousins: spoiled Hilary, pompous Carlton, impressionable Ashley and baby Nicky (introduced in season 3), as well as their sarcastic butler Geoffrey.

Cast and characters 
 = Main cast (credited) 
 = Recurring cast (4+)

Main

Recurring

Celebrity guest stars 
The show is notable for having a heavy celebrity guest presence, with more than forty celebrities guest starring throughout the series. Seasons 1 and 6 had the highest celebrity participation, with over 10 celebrity guest stars each.

Episodes

Development 

In 1990, music manager Benny Medina, along with his business partner, real estate mogul Jeff Pollack, decided to market a TV story based on Medina's life. Medina had grown up poor in East Los Angeles but his life changed when he befriended a rich white teenager, whose family lived in Beverly Hills and allowed Medina to live with them. Medina decided to use this part of his life as the main focus of the show. However, given that by then a black character living with a white family was a concept that had been done multiple times on TV, Medina decided to change the rich white family to a rich black family. "That way we could explore black-on-black prejudice as well as black class differences", Medina said in an interview for Ebony magazine.

Medina pitched the idea to Quincy Jones, who had just signed a TV deal with Time-Warner. Jones was impressed by the idea and arranged a meeting with NBC chief Brandon Tartikoff. Will Smith was well known at the time as one-half of the hip-hop duo DJ Jazzy Jeff & the Fresh Prince, which had put him on the mainstream radar, but he had come into debt after failing to pay taxes. At the suggestion of his then-girlfriend, Smith went to a taping of The Arsenio Hall Show where he met Medina by chance. Medina pitched the idea to Smith, but Smith was reluctant, having never acted before. Medina invited Smith to meet Jones at a party that Jones was throwing at his house in December 1989. There, Jones handed Smith a script for a failed Morris Day pilot that he had produced and challenged Smith to audition for Tartikoff on the spot. Smith did so, and the first contract for the show was drawn up that night in a limo outside. Three months later, the pilot was shot.

Andy Borowitz and his wife, Susan, are credited as the series' creators. Andy Borowitz, who was on a contract with NBC, was selected by Tartikoff to write the pilot. He based Will's cousins on Quincy Jones's daughters, and named Carlton after his friend Carlton Cuse. In 2015, he remarked that "it was written and taped in about three weeks, start to finish, and somehow it worked. It was just an explosion of really good luck."

The pilot episode began taping on May 1, 1990. Season 1 first aired in September 1990, and ended in May 1991. The series finale was taped on Thursday, March 21, 1996, and aired on Monday, May 20, 1996.

The theme song "Yo Home to Bel Air" was written and performed by Smith under his stage name, The Fresh Prince. The music was composed by Quincy Jones, who is credited with Smith at the end of each episode. The music often used to bridge scenes together during the show is based on a similar chord structure.

Crossovers and other appearances 
During the fall 1991–1992 season, NBC gained two hit television shows to anchor their Monday night lineup (Blossom aired immediately after The Fresh Prince of Bel-Air). To gain popularity between the two shows, Will Smith appeared in the Blossom episode "I'm with the Band" as himself under his rap stage name, The Fresh Prince. That same season, Karyn Parsons appeared in the Blossom episode "Wake Up Little Suzy" as Hilary Banks. Parsons also appeared in the Patti LaBelle sitcom Out All Night as Hilary.

In the House and Fresh Prince were both executive-produced by Winifred Hervey, David Salzman and Quincy Jones. During the second season's first episode, Alfonso Ribeiro and Tatyana Ali appeared as their Fresh Prince characters (Carlton and Ashley Banks) in the crossover episode "Dog Catchers". Later that season, James Avery (Phillip Banks) appeared as a mediator in the episode "Love on a One-Way Street".

Following Fresh Prince'''s conclusion, Ribeiro joined the principal cast of In the House from its third season as Dr. Maxwell Stanton. In the Season 4 episode "My Pest Friend's Wedding", Avery and Daphne Maxwell Reid (the second Vivian Banks) guest starred as Stanton's parents. Joseph Marcell, Geoffrey Butler on Fresh Prince, appeared as an officiating minister in the same episode.

 Syndication 
The series was produced by NBC Productions in association with the Stuffed Dog Company and Quincy Jones Entertainment (later Quincy Jones-David Salzman Entertainment in 1993). After the show was released to syndication in 1994, the series' distribution rights were picked up by Warner Bros. Television Distribution who continue to hold them to this day, while NBCUniversal owns the series copyright via NBC Productions' successor-in-interest, Universal Television.

Currently, reruns of the series are still aired around the world on ViacomCBS Domestic Media Networks' MTV2, BET and VH1, having previously been aired on its MTV, Nick at Nite, TeenNick, CMT, and Centric channels. Other past carriers include WGN America, TBS, TNT, Walt Disney Television's Disney XD, ABC Family and ViacomCBS Domestic Media Networks' Paramount Network.

The series attained huge popularity in the United Kingdom, where it aired on BBC Two between 1991 and 1996, with reruns airing on the network between 1996 and 2004; it was shown alongside The Simpsons and was later repeated on Trouble, Bravo, Channel One, Living, Sky Living Loves, Viva, MTV, Nickelodeon, Comedy Central, Comedy Central Extra and 5Star. In the United Kingdom, all seasons became available on BBC iPlayer from 1 January 2021, and also currently airs on Sky Comedy and Sky Showcase.

It also aired on Omni Television, YTV, Yes TV and CBC in Canada.

In Italy, the series aired under the name Willy, il principe di Bel-Air (Willy, the Prince of Bel-Air) on Italia 1 from September 20, 1993 until December 3, 1996.

The series became available to stream on HBO Max and Hulu on May 27, 2020. It streams in Canada on Crave.

 Home media 
Warner Home Video has released the complete series, seasons 1 to 6, on DVD in Region 1. Seasons 1 to 4 have been released in Regions 2 and 4. Seasons 5 to 6 have been released in Region 2 in Germany, and in the complete series boxset in the United Kingdom.

 Awards and nominations 

 Cultural impact and legacy The Fresh Prince of Bel-Air's success is considered to be a watershed moment for hip-hop and black television, with many publications referring to it as one of the greatest sitcoms of all time. Professor Andrew Horton stated: "Smith's genre of comedy, popularized on the sitcom Fresh Prince of Bel-Air, translated well into commercial box-office appeal. The Fresh Prince watered down and capitalized upon the then growing popularity of hip-hop and almost anticipated its dominance on the American scene".

Author Willie Tolliver noted: "What The Fresh Prince did accomplish was to put Smith and his character Will into an environment of affluence and possibility, thus changing the terms of his own Black identity. This social and cultural mobility is central to Smith's racial significance, and this will become evident again and again; he moves the image of the Black male into unaccustomed spaces just as Smith himself was in the process of conquering Hollywood."

 Reboot series 

On August 13, 2015, it was reported that a reboot of the show was in development by Overbrook Entertainment, with Will Smith serving as a producer. In August 2016, during a promotional interview with the E! television network for his then upcoming film Suicide Squad, Smith denied that a reboot was in development, saying that it would happen "...pretty close to when Hell freezes over".

In 2019, a mock trailer titled Bel-Air was uploaded on YouTube, written and directed by Morgan Cooper, for a darker, more dramatic re-imagining of the sitcom. Will Smith subsequently heavily praised the fan film, commenting that "Morgan did a ridiculous trailer for Bel-Air. Brilliant idea, the dramatic version of The Fresh Prince for the next generation", expressing interest in expanding the idea beyond the short film into a full Bel-Air reboot series.

In August 2020, it was announced that Will Smith and Morgan Cooper would be developing a reboot of the series based on Cooper's Bel-Air. The series had reportedly been in the works for over a year since Cooper posted his Bel-Air trailer on YouTube, with Netflix, Peacock and HBO Max all currently bidding for the series. On September 8, 2020, Peacock gave Bel-Air a two-season order, with the series produced by and copyrighted to Universal Television. In September 2021, the full cast was announced with newcomer Jabari Banks cast as Will Smith, Adrian Holmes as Philip Banks, Cassandra Freeman as Vivian Banks, Olly Sholotan as Carlton Banks, Coco Jones as Hilary Banks, Akira Akbar as Ashley Banks, Jimmy Akingbola as Geoffrey, Jordan L. Jones as Jazz and Simone Joy Jones as Lisa. The series premiered in February 2022.

 Reunion 
Much of the cast virtually reunited over a video call in an episode of Smith's Snapchat reality series Will From Home that premiered in April 2020. A reunion of the surviving original cast, The Fresh Prince Reunion'', aired on HBO Max in November 2020. Among other reminisces, Janet Hubert appeared, also appearing around this time in a joint radio interview with Smith where the two reconcile. More information and context were offered regarding the situation between Smith and Hubert and her exit when the two met for their conversation. Hubert discussed the turmoil in her personal life, her abusive marriage and that she had not actually been fired by the show. She was offered what she described as a "bad deal" to return for the fourth season and she turned it down. Smith talked about how grappling with his rapidly increasing fame at such a young age led him to make decisions during that time that he now regrets and wishes he had made differently. The reunion show also features a tribute to James Avery, who died in 2013, that was shown to the surviving cast. The tribute brought the entire cast to tears.

Explanatory notes

References

External links 

 
 

 
1990s American black sitcoms
1990s American sitcoms
1990s American teen sitcoms
1990 American television series debuts
1996 American television series endings
English-language television shows
Metafictional television series
NBC original programming
Television series about families
Television series about teenagers
Television series by Universal Television
Television series by Warner Bros. Television Studios
Television shows filmed in Los Angeles
Television shows set in Los Angeles
Television shows set in Philadelphia
Television series created by Andy Borowitz
Television series created by Susan Borowitz